The Naked Man is a 1998 comedy film, produced by Naked Man Productions, directed by J. Todd Anderson and co-written by Anderson and Ethan Coen.

Plot 
Dr. Edward Blis, Jr, a chiropractor by day, moonlights as a professional wrestler at night. His wrestling name is the Naked Man and he wears a naked body suit when wrestling. After his parents are killed by Sticks Varona, a cripple with crutches which double as machine guns, and an Elvis Presley impersonator, he loses his sanity. He adopts the persona of his wrestling character and goes on a rampage of revenge.

Cast 

 Michael Rapaport as Dr. Edward Blis, Jr.
 Michael Jeter as Sticks Varona
 John Carroll Lynch as Sticks' Driver
 Arija Bareikis as Kim Bliss
 Rachael Leigh Cook as Delores
 Joe Grifasi as Det. Koski
 John Slattery as Burns

Production

The film was shot in Minnesota, and featured Jordan, Minnesota and the Minneapolis Armory.

Music 

An official soundtrack for the movie was never released, but the film featured a score composed by Edward Bilous. And several songs written by Anderson and Coen, such as "Baby I Need Your Number" performed by Danny Wilde of The Rembrandts "I Do" performed by Debbie Gibson and "Expelled" performed by Delbert McClinton.

Reception 
On Rotten Tomatoes the film has an approval rating of 20% based on reviews from 5 critics.

References

External links 
 
 
 

1998 films
1998 comedy films
Films shot in Minnesota
American comedy films
1998 directorial debut films
1990s English-language films
1990s American films